Mount Yakeishi (jp: 焼石岳) is a mountain in the Ōu Mountains on Honshu, Japan. The mountain, which rises to a height of 1548 meters, is part of Kurikoma Quasi-National Park.

See Also
 List of mountains in Japan
 List of volcanoes in Japan

References 

Yakeishi